The Popular Representation Party (PRP) was a political party in Brazil. The PRP was founded by Plínio Salgado on 26 September 1945. He reassembled the former members of the Brazilian Integralism, and was ideologically aligned with the nationalist right. It always obtained representation in the Brazilian Congress and had a greater presence in the south. Salgado ran for President of Brazil in the 1955 election, won by Juscelino Kubitschek. He won around 8% of the vote.

Like all parties of that era, it was abolished by the military regime shortly after the coup of 1964. Most of its members joined the party of the military junta, the ARENA.

References

Political history of Brazil
Conservative parties in Brazil
Political parties established in 1945
1945 establishments in Brazil
Political parties disestablished in 1965
1965 disestablishments in Brazil
Defunct political parties in Brazil
Right-wing populist parties
Far-right political parties
Far-right political parties in Brazil
Fascist parties